Isoberlinia scheffleri is a species of plant in the family Fabaceae. It is found only in Tanzania.

References

Detarioideae
Endemic flora of Tanzania
Miombo
Trees of Africa
Vulnerable flora of Africa
Taxonomy articles created by Polbot